Anna Mazzamauro (born 1 December 1938) is an Italian actress, comedian and television personality.

Life and career 
Born Anna Maria Mazzamauro in Rome, Mazzamauro made her film debut in 1967, in Massimo Franciosa's Pronto... c'è una certa Giuliana per te. She is best known for her role of Mrs. Silvani in the Fantozzi film series. In 1994 she was nominated to Nastro d'Argento  for Best Supporting Actress for her performance in Fantozzi in paradiso. Mazzamauro is also active on stage and on television and is an author and a singer.

Filmography

References

External links 

 Anna Mazzamauro at Discogs

Actresses from Rome
Italian stage actresses
Italian film actresses
Italian television actresses
1954 births
20th-century Italian actresses
Italian television presenters
Living people
21st-century Italian actresses
20th-century Italian comedians
21st-century Italian comedians
Italian women comedians
Italian women television presenters